Chirakkara  is a village in Kollam district in the state of Kerala, India. Chirakkara is 16 km away from the town of Kollam and 8 km away from Paravur Town, which is famous for festivals, estuary, backwaters and beaches.

Demographics
 India census, Chirakkara had a population of 17184 with 8124 males and 9060 females. Chirakkara is a village formed by dividing Meenad Village of Kollam Taluk of Kollam District.  Likewise, Chirakkara is a Grama Panchayath formed by dividing Chathannoor Grama Panchayath.  The developing tourist spot Polachira is at Chirakkara Grama Panchayath.  Panchayath headquarters is at Chirakkarathazham.  The place named Chirakkara is here where famous Devi Temple situates. Chirakkara is a rural area.

Transportation
Chirakkara is just 2 km from Paravur-Parippally road.
The nearest railway station is Paravur Railway Station, which is 8 km from Chirakkara. There is bus service from kottiyam through chathannoor to chirakkara

Temples 

1) Chirakkara Devi Temple
2) Vilappuram Bhagavathy Temple
3) Kottekkunnu Subrahmanya Swami Temple
4) Chirakkara ayiravilly Temple
5) Yakshippura sreebhagavathi temple
6) Gurunagappan Temple Chirakkara-chirakkarathazham
7) Uliyanadu Mahadevar Temple
8) Ayyappa Temple, Kotheri
9) Mahadeva Temple, Chirakkarathazam 
10) Vevukkonnam Temple, Chirakkara
11) Polachira Sree Mahavishnu Temple
12) Chamundeshwari deviTemple Kunnathoor
13) Vevukonam temple, Chirakkara
14) NagatharaMoorthy kavu, Chirakkara

Institutions 

1) S.N. College, Chathannoor
2) Government H.S., Uliyanad
3) Government H.S., Chirakkara.
4) Government H.S., Nedumgolam
5) Anandavilasam Library, Vilappuram
6) Chirakkara public library
7) Kairali Vayanashala (library)
8) Chirakkara Co-operative Bank
9) Indian Bank Chirakkara

Places of interest

Anathavalam:  The famous Anathavalam (The centre where domestic elephants are there) is just in its border.

Polachira: The best sight seeing place and foreign bird sanctuary.

References

 Plan Documents of Ithikkara Block Panchayath
 Plan Documents of Chirakkara Grama Panchayath
 Samagra Vikasana Rekha of Chathannoor Grama Panchayath

Villages in Kollam district